The following lists events that happened during 2010 in Saudi Arabia.

Incumbents
Monarch: Abdullah
Crown Prince: Sultan

Events 

 In February, the Saudi government allowed female lawyers to represent women in family court.
 In April, a new form of ID card was released that allowed women to travel to countries within the Gulf Cooperation Council without needing male permission to apply for it. However, permission was still required for them to travel abroad.

References

 
2010s in Saudi Arabia
Saudi Arabia
Saudi Arabia
Years of the 21st century in Saudi Arabia